List of ISO standards for transliterations and romanizations:

Romanizations 
ISO 3602:1989 (Romanization of Japanese (kana script))
ISO 7098:2015 (Romanization of Chinese)

Transliterations 
 ISO 9:1995 (Transliteration of Cyrillic characters into Latin characters — Slavic and non-Slavic languages)
 ISO 233-2:1993 (Transliteration of Arabic characters into Latin characters — Part 2: Arabic language — Simplified transliteration)
 ISO 233-3:1999 (Transliteration of Arabic characters into Latin characters — Part 3: Persian language — Simplified transliteration)
 ISO 259:1984 (Transliteration of Hebrew characters into Latin characters)
 ISO 259-2:1994 (Transliteration of Hebrew characters into Latin characters — Part 2: Simplified transliteration)
 ISO 843:1997 (Conversion of Greek characters into Latin characters)
 ISO 9984:1996 (Transliteration of Georgian characters into Latin characters)
 ISO 9985:1996 (Transliteration of Armenian characters into Latin characters)
 ISO 11940:1998 (Transliteration of Thai)
 ISO 11940-2:2007 (Transliteration of Thai characters into Latin characters — Part 2: Simplified transcription of Thai language)
 ISO/TR 11941:1996 (Transliteration of Korean script into Latin characters)
 ISO 15919:2001 (Transliteration of Devanagari and related Indic scripts into Latin characters)
 ISO 20674-1:2019 (Transliteration of scripts in use in Thailand — Part 1: Transliteration of Akson-Thai-Noi)

See also
List of ISO standards

External links
ISO field 01.140.10 — Writing and transliteration

Romanization
 
ISO romanizations